Elections to Sheffield City Council were held on 3 May 1984. One third of the council was up for election.

Election result

This result had the following consequences for the total number of seats on the Council after the elections:

Ward results

John Butler was a sitting councillor for Sharrow ward

References

1984 English local elections
1984
1980s in Sheffield
May 1984 events in the United Kingdom